Aditya Sethi (born 13 August 1997) is an Indian cricketer. He made his List A debut on 8 October 2019, for Uttarakhand in the 2019–20 Vijay Hazare Trophy.

References

External links
 

1997 births
Living people
Indian cricketers
Uttarakhand cricketers
Place of birth missing (living people)